Olympia is one of 36 sections in the genus Hypericum. It contains four species and its type species is H. olympicum.

References

Olympia
Olympia